Hosny Fathy (born March 19, 1989) is an Egyptian football (soccer) right full back who plays for Misr Lel-Makkasa of Egypt.

Honours

Club
Zamalek
Egyptian Super Cup: 2016

References

1989 births
Egyptian footballers
Living people
Misr Lel Makkasa SC players
Telephonat Beni Suef SC players
Zamalek SC players
Egyptian Premier League players
Association football fullbacks